Age of Ascent is a video game, aiming "to become the biggest MMO ever". It uses an on-demand scaling cloud-based architecture and features real-time direct piloting in a single integrated universe. It was announced on February 28, 2014.

On March 14, 2014 Age of Ascent sought to officially break the Guinness World Record for the "World's Largest Videogame PvP Battle" in a public alpha. The alpha was designed for 50,000+ players with a throttling mechanism for up to 2,000,000. At peak they had 997 concurrent players using 2% of their deployed server CPU capacity and did not break the record of 4075.

One particularity of the game as opposed to other games of the genre, is that it is browser-based and relies heavily on WebGL for its implementation, allowing players to drop in and start playing, irrespective of their device, and without the need to install plug-ins, apps or executables.

Scale 
Powered  by Microsoft Azure, Age of Ascent has been designed from the ground up allowing it to run across hundreds of computers, yet create a single, fluid, cohesive universe. It is said "Age of Ascent will usher in a new era of ultra-MMOs".

Illyriad Games worked closely with  the Microsoft Technology Centre and the Microsoft Developer eXperience Technical Evangelism & Development team  to fully exploit the Azure platform.

To achieve responsiveness the game is partitioned across a number of datacenters, geographically distributed across the globe, offering high-bandwidth, low-latency network access for the players.

See also 
 Eve Online – persistent-world MMORPG set in a science fiction space setting by CCP Games

References

External links 

 Official website of Age of Ascent

Massively multiplayer online role-playing games
Science fiction video games
Space combat simulators
Space trading and combat simulators
Upcoming video games